| 82 kg

Rumen Dimitrov (born May 10, 1982) is a Bulgarian Sambo practitioner and mixed martial artist who has won gold and two bronze medals at the Combat Sambo World Championships.

Sambo career
Part of the Dimitrov family which has produced significant success in Combat Sambo for Bulgaria, Rumen has medaled two consecutive years in the middleweight category for Combat Sambo. When he was a child he weighed around 100 kilograms, but his coach Gele , who taught him sambo and judo , made him the professional he is today.

Mixed martial arts career
Competing primarily in Bulgaria, Dimitrov has proven himself to be a rising prospect much like his brother Rosen Dimitrov. He is the current MAX FIGHT middleweight champion, which is a Bulgarian promotion.

Mixed martial arts record

|-
|   NC
|align=center| 13-0-2 (1)
|Ronny Alexander Landaeta Utrera
| No Contest
| MAXFIGHT 28
|
|align=center| 3
|align=center| 5:00
|Sveti Vlas, Bulgaria
|
|-
|  Win
|align=center| 13-0-2
| Nikolay Krastev
| Submission (kimura)
| ММА MAXFIGHT-27	
|
|align=center| 1
|align=center| 2:14
|Sofia, Bulgaria
|
|-
|  Win
|align=center| 12-0-2
| Mikel Cortes
| TKO (punches)
| ММА MAXFIGHT-21	
|
|align=center| 1
|align=center| 2:39
|Sofia, Bulgaria
|
|-
|  Win
|align=center| 11-0-2
| Shonie Carter
| TKO (punches)
| ММА MAXFIGHT-19	
|
|align=center| 2
|align=center| 2:48
|Sofia, Bulgaria
|
|-
|  Win
|align=center| 10-0-2
| Ivan Ivanov
| TKO (punches)
| BMMAF - Warriors 18 	
|
|align=center| 1
|align=center| 3:17
|Sofia, Bulgaria
|
|-
|  Win
|align=center| 9-0-2
| Nikolai Alexiev
| Decision (unanimous)
| ММА MAXFIGHT-16
|
|align=center| 2
|align=center| 5:00
|Sveti Vlas, Bulgaria
|
|-
|  Win
|align=center| 8-0-2
| Ignas Petkus
| Submission (rear-naked choke)
| Real Pain Challenge: Domination
|
|align=center| 1
|align=center| N/A 
|Sofia, Bulgaria
|
|-
|  Win
|align=center| 7-0-2
| Ivan Simic
| Submission (guillotine choke)
|BMMAF - Warriors 9
|
|align=center| 1
|align=center| 0:53
|Sveti Vlas, Bulgaria
|
|-
|  Win
|align=center| 6-0-2
| Hristo Shirev
| TKO (punches)
|WFC 7 Gudejev vs. Carvalho
|
|align=center| 2
|align=center| 3:34
|Sofia, Bulgaria
|
|-
| Draw
|align=center| 5-0-2
| Bastien Huveneers
| Draw
|BMMAF Warriors 5
|
|align=center| 2
|align=center| 5:00
|Sofia, Bulgaria
|
|-
|  Win
|align=center| 5-0-1
| Michele Verginelli
| Decision (split)
|Real Pain Challenge 2
|
|align=center| 3
|align=center| 5:00
|Sofia, Bulgaria
|
|-
|  Win
|align=center| 4-0-1
| Hristo Shirev
| TKO (punches)
|Real Pain Challenge 1
|
|align=center| 2
|align=center| 3:36
|Sofia, Bulgaria
|
|-
|  Win
|align=center| 3-0-1
| Marko Djukic
| Submission (armbar)
| BCM MMA Open Sofia
|
|align=center| 2
|align=center| 1:47
|Sofia, Bulgaria
|
|-
|  Win
|align=center| 2-0-1
| Vladimir Shumanov
| KO
|Shooto - Bulgaria
|
|align=center| 1
|align=center| 1:43
|Sofia, Bulgaria
|
|-
| Draw
|align=center| 1-0-1
| Stoyan Dimitar
| Draw
|Shooto - Bulgaria
|
|align=center| 2
|align=center| 5:00
|Sofia, Bulgaria
|
|-
|  Win
|align=center| 1-0-0
| Ricardo Tannus
| Submission
|Ichigeki - Bulgaria
|
|align=center| 1
|align=center| 1:45
|Sofia, Bulgaria
|MMA Debut
|-

References

External links
 
 

1982 births
Bulgarian male mixed martial artists
Bulgarian sambo practitioners
Living people
Middleweight mixed martial artists
Sportspeople from Sofia
Mixed martial artists utilizing sambo